Michael Andrew Simpson (born 14 November 1965) is an English rock and blues guitarist, singer, and songwriter. He was born in Rotherham, West Riding of Yorkshire, England.

Career

In the early 1980s, Simpson found work as a session guitarist on the London scene, after receiving airplay of his track's on BBC Radio 1's "Friday Night Rock Show". 

In the mid 1990s, Simpson worked with John Parr of 'St Elmo's Fire fame, with his guitar work featured on the album Man with a Vision, and also on hit films such as The Running Man with Arnold Schwarzenegger and Three Men and a Baby with Tom Selleck. 

Throughout the 1990s, Simpson remained busy working with the UK session drummer and producer Graham Broad, and recorded sessions for Rolling Stone Bill Wyman, Pink Floyd's Roger Waters, Tina Turner, Bryan Adams, and Go West.

In 2004, his original track "A Father's Son" won an International Songwriters Award, sponsored by the Brits Trust. It received major TV and Radio airplay, along with Simpson's song "Looking Through My Eyes" which was released to raise money and awareness for Autism.  

In June 2005, Simpson was asked to guest at the 80th birthday celebration of B.B. King at his Blues club in New York. He has also played alongside other guitar greats such as Gary Moore, Snowy White, and Alvin Lee. In the same month Simpson released his long awaited debut solo album Hard Road, on the Mad Ears Productions label. The album received support from Paul Jones (BBC Radio 2), and was playlisted on the US Blue's Radio Network. One of the tracks from the album, "Sometimes I Get So Lonely", was nominated for best original song at The Kevin Thorpe Memorial Award. Simpson teamed up once again with producer and co-writer, Andy Littlewood, to record his second studio album, Cruel World. The album was released in March 2012 and featured guest female artist Malaya, on the track, "Find Another You". The instrumental, "Road To Memphis", was licensed for the soundtrack of the short film, Road To Hell, and was also used in the award winning indie documentary A Message To Myself.

In 2014, Simpson released his third album Unfinished Business with 14 tracks of blues guitar, rock anthems, and country blues guitar. Album highlights include "Playing The Losing Hand", "Trouble Brewing", and the jazzy blues title track "Unfinished Business". The album includes a nine-minute tribute to Gary Moore, titled "Drowning in My Tears". The album received airplay on BBC Radio 2 with tracks played by both Paul Jones and Alex Lester, and the single "Playing The Losing Hand" reached the number one spot in the Dutch Hit Tracks 100 Music chart.

Over the past years, Simpson has recorded sessions for Starship, Mockingbird Hill, Dave Hunt, and co-wrote the title track "Bourbon Street", and played guitar on the Malaya Blue's debut album. Simpson has been active on the UK blues scene, also working with the UK session drummer Sam Kelly, and bassist Andy Hodge.

On 27 March 2017, Simpson released his fourth studio album, teaming up once again, with long time producer Andy Littlewood, which features Italian female artist Eva Carboni, who guests on vocals for the track "River of Life". The album also featured the Ray Charles-inspired track "Sweet Lorraine", and the Celtic rock influenced title track "Black Rain". The album featured a wide range of guitar influences in the style of Gary Moore, B.B. King, Django Reinhardt, Peter Green, Jeff Beck, and Robert Johnson. There are plans for a tour with Simpson teaming up with the original members of the Gary Moore band; Vic Martin (keyboards), Pete Rees (bass), and Graham Walker (drums).

Discography

References

External links
Official website
Cdbay personal page 

1965 births
Living people
English rock guitarists
English blues guitarists
English male guitarists
English male singers
English songwriters
English rock singers
English blues singers
British male songwriters